The green warbler-finch (Certhidea olivacea) is a species of bird, one of Darwin's finches in the tanager family Thraupidae. Sometimes classified in the family Emberizidae, more recent studies have shown it to belong in the tanager family.

When Darwin collected it in 1835 during the Beagle survey expedition he mistakenly thought it was a wren, but on return to England he was informed in March 1837 by the ornithologist John Gould that the bird was in the group of finches.

It is endemic to the Galápagos Islands, Ecuador.
This species is closely related to the grey warbler-finch, and were formerly considered conspecific, but both species differ in appearance, distribution, habitat, and song. The green warbler-finch consists of only one subspecies, the nominate olivacea, from Santiago, Rábida, Pinzón, Isabela, Fernandina, and Santa Cruz. Green warbler-finches have a greenish coloration to blend into their lusher semihumid forest habitats, as well as distinctive reddish throat patches on breeding males.

Its natural habitats are subtropical or tropical dry forests, subtropical or tropical moist montane forests, and subtropical or tropical dry shrubland.

Notes

References
 

Certhidea
Endemic birds of the Galápagos Islands
Birds described in 1837